The Strange Madame X is a 1951 French drama film directed by Jean Grémillon. The screenplay was written by Marcelle Maurette, Pierre Laroche (dialogue) and Albert Valentin (adaptation). It stars Michèle Morgan and Henri Vidal. It tells the story of a housemaid who marries an aristocrat, then falls in love with a low-born laborer and becomes pregnant by him.

Cast
 Michèle Morgan as Irene  
 Henri Vidal as Etienne  
 Maurice Escande as Jacques  
 Arlette Thomas as Jeanette
 Louise Conte as Angèle 
 Robert Vattier as Moissac 
 Paul Barge as uncle Léon 
 Roland Alexandre as Marcel

External links
L'Étrange Madame X at Films de France

1951 drama films
1951 films
Films directed by Jean Grémillon
French drama films
1950s French-language films
Films about adultery in France
French black-and-white films
1950s French films